KCMM (99.1 FM, "The One") is a radio station licensed to serve Belgrade, Montana.  The station is owned by Gallatin Valley Witness Inc. It airs a Christian Contemporary music format.

The station was assigned the KCMM call letters by the Federal Communications Commission on April 12, 2000.

References

External links
KCMM official website

Contemporary Christian radio stations in the United States
Belgrade, Montana
Radio stations established in 2000
CNM
2000 establishments in Montana